The Prisoner's Dilemma is a Big Finish Productions audiobook based on the long-running British science fiction television series Doctor Who.

The Companion Chronicles "talking books" are each narrated by one of the Doctor's companions and feature a second, guest-star voice along with music and sound effects.

Plot 
Without the Doctor's direct assistance, Ace has a mission on the peaceful world of Erratoon, where she meets a newly created woman named Zara.

Cast 
 Ace — Sophie Aldred
 Zara – Laura Doddington

Critical reception
Writing for Sci-Fi Bulletin, Paul Simpson gave it 7/10, noting that the play did not stand alone outside of the other Key 2 Time stories.  Richard McGinlay, of sci-fi online, also gave it a 7/10, but disagreed regarding the other point, saying that it could be listened to first.

References

External links 
Big Finish – The Prisoner's Dilemma

Companion Chronicles audio plays
2009 audio plays
Seventh Doctor audio plays